El Abayarde is the debut album by the Puerto Rican rapper Tego Calderón. It included the singles "Pa' Que Retozen", "Guasa Guasa" and "Al Natural". It was released in 2002 through White Lion Records selling over 50,000 copies its first week between Puerto Rico and some parts of the United States. It would eventually be internationally distributed by Sony BMG in 2003. The album sold 132,000 copies in the US and more than 350,000 copies worldwide. El Abayarde was nominated for a Lo Nuestro Award for Urban Album of the Year and Best Rap/Hip Hop Album in the 4th Latin Grammy Awards in 2003.

Album details
El Abayarde was one of the first reggaeton albums to be successful in the United States, and also of the genre. Having five singles released, it is the album with the most singles in Tego Calderon's career. The album took reggaeton to a new level, and revolutionized reggaeton in North America. The album features contributions by Eddie Dee, Luisma, and Maestro. The tracks were produced by Luny Tunes, DJ Nelson, Maestro, Rafy Mercenario, DJ Joe, DJ Adam, Echo and Coo-kee. This is Tego's debut album and was one of the albums that internationalized reggaeton. The singles include: "Abayarde", "Gracias", "Cambumbo" and "Pa' Que Retozen".

El Abayarde is one of the albums that help revolutionized reggaeton worldwide, along with Daddy Yankee's Barrio Fino, Ivy Queen's Diva and Don Omar's The Last Don. It was the most purchased reggaeton album in Puerto Rico of that year, helping it break the record for the most sales as a reggaeton CD in its first week. The album is credited with introducing reggaeton to mainstream audiences in places like Houston, New York, Miami and Los Angeles in the United States.

Track listing

Charts

References

Tego Calderón albums
2003 debut albums
Albums produced by Luny Tunes
Albums produced by Noriega
Albums produced by Rafy Mercenario